Caspar René Hirschfeld (born 21 May 1965) is a German composer and violinist.

Life 
Born  in Wernigerode, Hirschfeld received his first violin lessons at the music school from the age of 5. At the age of 9 he began composing. From 1982 to 1987 he studied composition with Udo Zimmermann and Wilfried Krätzschmar and violin with Christian Redder at the Hochschule für Musik Carl Maria von Weber Dresden. Until 1989 he was master student of Udo Zimmermann. Other important mentors were Paul-Heinz Dittrich, Gret Palucca, the dancer  and the painter Günter Firit.

From 1987 to 1994 Hirschfeld taught at the Dresden Academy of Music and the Hochschule für Musik "Hanns Eisler" in Berlin. He also worked at the ACMP Foundation in New York and at the Rheinsberg Music Academy.

Hirschfeld's compositional oeuvre includes incidental music, ballets, symphonies, choral music, chamber music, solo works and songs as well as tango and jazz cycles. In 1991 his chamber opera Bianca was premiered at the Salzburg Festival.

His musical language can be attributed to New Music, but cannot be assigned to a particular school, since his personal style combines a wide variety of influences. In many works, strongly motoric elements and culminating drama are contrasted with a distinct internalization and singing and gestural-dancing.

Hirschfeld also performs as a violinist, primarily with Baroque music (among others with the Albert/Hirschfeld Duo with the guitarist Sebastian Albert) and contemporary music

Awards
 Carl Maria von Weber Prize of the city of Dresden (1984)
 Mendelssohn Scholarship of the Ministry of Culture of the GDR (1987/88)
 Göttinger Gitarrenpreis (2000)
 Carl von Ossietzky Kompositionspreis (2015)

Literature 
 Hirschfeld, Caspar René. In Peter Hollfelder: Klaviermusik. Internationales chronologisches Lexikon. Geschichte. Komponisten. Werke. Supplement, Noetzel, Wilhelmshaven 2005, .
 Hirschfeld, Caspar René. In Axel Schniederjürgen (ed.): Kürschners Musiker-Handbuch. 5. Auflage, Saur Verlag, Munnich 2006, .

External links 
 Offizielle Website von Caspar René Hirschfeld
 
 Caspar René Hirschfeld at Sound cloud
 
 Notenmaterial zu Werken C. R. Hirschfelds

German classical violinists
Male classical violinists
German male dancers
Academic staff of the Hochschule für Musik Hanns Eisler Berlin
20th-century German dancers
20th-century classical composers
21st-century classical composers
21st-century German composers
1965 births
Living people
People from Wernigerode
21st-century German male musicians
20th-century German male musicians